Beach Buggy Blitz is a racing video game developed and published by Vector Unit for Android, iOS and BlackBerry.

Gameplay 
Beach Buggy Blitz is built around an "infinite drive" mechanic that challenges you to drive as far as possible. You can collect coins along the way to upgrade or paint your car, unlock new vehicles and drivers, even customize the game itself with new powerups and consumables.

Reception

Gamezebo gave the Android version a rave review, saying that "Beach Buggy Blitz is one of the best titles Android has to offer," and 148Apps said "Beach Buggy Blitz is fantastic and one of the best of its kind on iOS. An absolute pleasure to play and play again."

Sequels 
The game has received two sequels; Beach Buggy Racing which first released in 2014, and Beach Buggy Racing 2  which first released in 2018. Both titles are free, with the exception of their home console  releases which must be paid for, originally the home console version of Beach Buggy Racing 2 entitled Beach Buggy Racing 2: Island Adventure was set to release in 2020, however due to the COVID-19 pandemic, the title would be delayed to the first quarter of 2021 as stated in Vector Unit's website, the title was released on 10 March 2021. Beach Buggy Racing 2 is playable on Tesla vehicles.

See also
 Mario Kart
 Crash Team Racing
 Team Sonic Racing

References

External links
 
  Beach Buggy Blitz on Google Play
  Beach Buggy Blitz on iTunes
  Beach Buggy Blitz on Metacritic

2012 video games
Android (operating system) games
BlackBerry 10 games
IOS games
Kart racing video games
Video games developed in the United States
Single-player video games